Joint Body is a 2011 American crime thriller film written and directed by Brian Jun and starring Mark Pellegrino and Alicia Witt. The film is about a convict who is abandoned by his ex-wife and prevented from seeing his young daughter. As a parolee he develops a relationship with a lonely and troubled woman, whom he saves from a violent attack, killing the assailant in the process. Once more on the run, he is forced to re-evaluate his freedom as he evades the law and faces demons from his past. The film was shot on location in various small towns in southern Illinois: Alton, Wood River, East Alton, and Jerseyville. Produced by James Choi, Brian Jun, and Max Velez for 40/West, the film premiered on April 29, 2011 at the Newport Beach Film Festival.

Plot
While doing time in prison for a violent offense, Nick Burke (Mark Pellegrino) is visited by his wife who informs him that after waiting for seven years, she is divorcing him and has taken out a restraining order against him to prevent him from seeing their daughter. Sometime later, after accepting the parole board's condition that he relinquish all custodial rights of his daughter, he is given his freedom. Now in his mid-forties and determined to start a new life, Nick tries to find his way back into society and move beyond his violent criminal past. He meets with his parole officer, finds a small motel room, and attends an AA meeting.

Nick's younger brother Dean (Ryan O'Nan) visits him at the motel and describes his life as a newlywed and police officer, having just graduated from the police academy. Although their relationship seems strained, Nick still looks to connect with his brother, even though he never visited him in prison. Before leaving, Dean gives his older brother a gun for protection. Nick soon finds work at a manufacturing plant.

At the motel, Nick meets a lonely and troubled stripper named Michelle Page (Alicia Witt), whose isolated life is interrupted by the deaths of her elderly neighbors. Nick asks his attractive neighbor out for coffee, and the two begin to share their stories with each other.

One morning, Michelle's former acquaintance Danny Wilson (Tom Guiry), whom she hasn't seen in three years, shows up after his three-year tour of duty in Afghanistan, expecting to rekindle their relationship. Michelle hardly knows this man who has developed an obsession over her. When Michelle rejects his advances and his demands for a personal reward for his service to his country, he sticks a gun in her face and brutally rapes her in her room. Hearing the commotion, Nick runs to her room with his brother's gun in hand. In the confrontation, both men are shot — Danny is mortally wounded.

In the coming days, Michelle visits Nick in the hospital as he recovers from his gunshot wound to the stomach. When he learns that Danny died from his wounds, and knowing that he violated his parole and would be sent back to prison—no matter how good his intentions in stopping the attack, Nick leaves the hospital with Michelle's help, and the two drive to the home of Nick's brother Dean and his pregnant wife. There they get a glimpse of a domestic life they have never known. The relationship between the two brothers remains strained, yet Nick reaches out to make some familial connection with Dean, whose only advice is to "disappear".

The next morning, Nick and Michelle leave in Nick's old truck, knowing they have become outlaws on the run. They find solace in each other's arms that night in a motel. Soon after, police detectives arrive at Dean's house with the gun he gave his brother. Convinced that Michelle gave the gun to police, when Nick calls, Dean tells him that she betrayed him. Later, Nick confronts Michelle about the gun, and she swears she did not give it to the police — that they must have discovered where she had hidden the weapon. That night they have sex.

In the morning, Michelle discovers that Nick has abandoned her, perhaps for her own protection. Later, back at her motel, Michelle is arrested by the police and she is taken to jail. Meanwhile, Nick drives to his daughter's school and meets one of her teachers, who tells him she is doing fine. After school, he observes his daughter leaving with her friends, but he does not approach her. Sometime later, on a quiet deserted lake, Nick floats across the water in his old boat.

Cast
 Mark Pellegrino as Nick Burke
 Alicia Witt as Michelle Page
 Bellamy Young as Jane Chapman
 Tom Guiry as Danny Wilson
 Ryan O'Nan as Dean Burke
 Carlos Michael Hagene as Club Patron
 Robert Nolan Clark as Shop Foreman
 Vis Brown as Commissioner Ryan
 Matthew Linhardt as Todd
 Emma Ve as Lawyer
 Daesha Lynn as Caroline 'Chaz' Burke
 Matthew Terry as Ex-convict
 James Anthony as Cappy Knight
 Bradley Blackorby as Unnamed Cop
 Paul Strathman as Lawyer at Hearing
 Michael W. McClure as Doctor
 Scott Woelfel as Cop #1

Production

Filming
Joint Body was filmed on location in various small towns in southern Illinois, USA.

Soundtrack
The soundtrack included the song "About Me", written and performed by Alicia Witt.

Critical reception
In his review in Cranes Are Flying, Robert Kennedy wrote that Pellegrino and Witt are "both excellent", but that the film suffered from the director's script, which was "abysmally weak". Kennedy went on to write:

Releases
Joint Body was released on DVD on July 24, 2012.

References

External links
 
 
 

2011 films
2011 crime thriller films
American crime thriller films
Films set in Illinois
2010s English-language films
2010s American films